Peter George may refer to: 

Peter George (author) (1924–1966), British writer
Peter George (cricketer) (born 1986), Australian cricketer
Peter George (professor) (1941–2017), Canadian economist
Pete George (1929–2021), American weightlifter

See also